Charmes-la-Côte is a commune of Meurthe-et-Moselle department in northeastern France.

See also
Communes of the Meurthe-et-Moselle department

References

Charmeslacote